Ívar Ásgrímsson (born 11 April 1965) is an Icelandic basketball coach and the former head coach of the Icelandic women's national basketball team. He led Haukar to the national men's finals in 2016 where they lost to KR.

Playing career

Club career
Ívar played for 14 seasons in the Icelandic Úrvalsdeild, 11 of them with Haukar where he won the Icelandic Basketball Cup in 1985, 1986 and 1996. He won the national championship in 1988 with Haukar after beating Njarðvík in the finals. He scored 14 points in the third and deciding game of the series, and sent it into a second overtime after scoring two free throws with 10 seconds left.

Icelandic national team
Between 1986 and 1991, Ívar played 15 games for the Icelandic national basketball team.

Coaching career

Club career
After coaching the Haukar team since 2011, Ívar announced in March 2019 that he would leave the team and the end of the season.

On 26 May 2019, Ívar was hired as the head coach of 1. deild kvenna club Breiðablik.

National team career
Ívar was hired as the head coach of the Icelandic women's national basketball team for two years in 2004. In 2014 he was rehired as the head coach. He is the longest tenured head coach in Iceland's women's team history, having coached the team for 7 years. After the team's last game in the EuroBasket Women 2019 qualification, Ívar announced that it was his last game with the team as he would not seek a renewal of his contract.

National team record

Source

References

External links
Career stats at kki.is

1965 births
Living people
Ivar Asgrimsson
Ivar Asgrimsson
Ivar Asgrimsson
Ivar Asgrimsson
Ivar Asgrimsson
Ivar Asgrimsson
Ivar Asgrimsson
Ivar Asgrimsson
Ivar Asgrimsson
Ivar Asgrimsson
Ivar Asgrimsson
Ivar Asgrimsson
Ivar Asgrimsson
Ivar Asgrimsson
Ivar Asgrimsson